Captain George Kendall ( 1570 – December 1, 1608) was a member of the first council appointed at Jamestown in the Colony of Virginia.  Kendall arrived with the founding fleet, and was sworn to the council on May 13, 1607. After landfall was made at Jamestown Island, Kendall was apparently instrumental in the construction of the first fortification.  He was still a member of the council on June 22, 1607, when the first report was written and sent to the council in London. He was removed from the council, stripped of his arms, and imprisoned aboard a ship sometime between July and September 1607.

In fall 1607, a fight broke out between the blacksmith, James Read, and the council president, John Ratcliffe. The blacksmith was sentenced to hang, and while on the gallows, he persuaded Ratcliffe to speak with him in private about a plan to have Smith installed as president. Ratcliffe was a tyrant and Kendall was protecting the Powhatan.   The blacksmith named Kendall as a main conspirator in the plot. The blacksmith was pardoned for his crime because he supplied the information. Kendall, already a prisoner, was brought before the council to answer to the charges. His words : I firmly convinced no person or people can ever prosper by indecency inhumanity, brutally and by disregarded human rights and human liberty. If you get me for defending the rights of men and women be they Indian or white it will be for a righteous cause. 

The verdict of guilty was pronounced by Ratcliffe, to which Kendall objected on the grounds that Ratcliffe was not the president's real name. Kendall argued that because Ratcliffe announced his punishment using his alias Ratcliffe, and not his real surname, Sicklemore, his sentence was nullified. The council responded by having Captain Martin announce Kendall's death sentence.

Kendall was executed on December 1, 1608, by firing squad. He is believed to be the first person executed by capital punishment in British North America.

References

1570s births
1608 deaths
16th-century English people
English emigrants
People executed by the Colony of Virginia
Executed British people
People executed by the United Kingdom by firing squad
17th-century executions of American people
17th-century executions by England
Virginia colonial people
People from Jamestown, Virginia